Solbiate Arno is a comune (municipality) in the Province of Varese in the Italian region Lombardy, located about 40 km northwest of Milan and about 11 km south of Varese. As of 31 December 2004, it had a population of 4,157 and an area of 3.0 km².

Solbiate Arno borders the following municipalities: Albizzate, Carnago, Caronno Varesino, Jerago con Orago, Oggiona con Santo Stefano.

It is served by Albizzate-Solbiate Arno railway station.

Demographic evolution

References

Cities and towns in Lombardy